Spirit of the Stones is an action video game that runs on the Commodore 64 and takes place on the Isle of Wight. It is based on a book by John Howard Worsley. The one and only audio file used in the entire game is Modest Mussorgsky's Night on Bald Mountain arranged by Chris Cox.

Gameplay
The player plays as a treasure hunter who needs to gather all 40 diamonds from the undead infested island to win the game. The game starts as an overview of the island. When the player enters one of the 21 buildings, the game switches to a platform level.

References

External links

1984 video games
Commodore 64-only games
Video games about ghosts
Commodore 64 games
Video games developed in the United Kingdom
Video games set on the Isle of Wight